The 2009 Brandenburg state election was held on 27 September 2009 to elect the members of the 5th Landtag of Brandenburg. It took place on the same day as the 2009 federal election and 2009 Schleswig-Holstein state election. The incumbent government of the Social Democratic Party (SPD) and Christian Democratic Union (CDU) led by Minister-President Matthias Platzeck took small losses, but retained a majority. However, the SPD chose to form a government with The Left rather than continue the SPD–CDU coalition.

The election saw the Free Democratic Party and The Greens re-enter the Landtag for the first time since the 1990 election, while the German People's Union lost all its seats.

Parties
The table below lists parties represented in the 4th Landtag of Brandenburg.

Opinion polling

Election result

|-
! colspan="2" | Party
! Votes
! %
! +/-
! Seats 
! +/-
! Seats %
|-
| bgcolor=| 
| align=left | Social Democratic Party (SPD)
| align=right| 458,840
| align=right| 33.0
| align=right| 1.1
| align=right| 31
| align=right| 2
| align=right| 35.2
|-
| bgcolor=| 
| align=left | The Left (Linke)
| align=right| 377,112
| align=right| 27.2
| align=right| 0.8
| align=right| 26
| align=right| 3
| align=right| 29.5
|-
| bgcolor=| 
| align=left | Christian Democratic Union (CDU)
| align=right| 274,825
| align=right| 19.8
| align=right| 0.4
| align=right| 19
| align=right| 1
| align=right| 21.6
|-
| bgcolor=| 
| align=left | Free Democratic Party (FDP)
| align=right| 100,123
| align=right| 7.2
| align=right| 3.9
| align=right| 7
| align=right| 7
| align=right| 8.0
|-
| bgcolor=| 
| align=left | Alliance 90/The Greens (Grüne)
| align=right| 78,550
| align=right| 5.7
| align=right| 2.1
| align=right| 5
| align=right| 5
| align=right| 5.7
|-
! colspan=8|
|-
| bgcolor=| 
| align=left | National Democratic Party (NPD)
| align=right| 35,544
| align=right| 2.6
| align=right| 2.6
| align=right| 0
| align=right| ±0
| align=right| 0
|-
| bgcolor=#000088|
| align=left | Free Voters (FW)
| align=right| 23,296
| align=right| 1.7
| align=right| 1.7
| align=right| 0
| align=right| ±0
| align=right| 0
|-
| bgcolor=| 
| align=left | German People's Union (DVU)
| align=right| 15,903
| align=right| 1.1
| align=right| 5.0
| align=right| 0
| align=right| 6
| align=right| 0
|-
| bgcolor=|
| align=left | Others
| align=right| 24,529
| align=right| 1.8
| align=right| 
| align=right| 0
| align=right| ±0
| align=right| 0
|-
! align=right colspan=2| Total
! align=right| 1,388,722
! align=right| 100.0
! align=right| 
! align=right| 88
! align=right| ±0
! align=right| 
|-
! align=right colspan=2| Voter turnout
! align=right| 
! align=right| 67.0
! align=right| 10.6
! align=right| 
! align=right| 
! align=right| 
|}

Notes

References

Brandenburg
Elections in Brandenburg